Christmas on the Square (full title Dolly Parton's Christmas on the Square) is a 2020 American Christmas musical film directed and choreographed by Debbie Allen. Starring Dolly Parton, Christine Baranski, Jenifer Lewis, and Treat Williams, the plot follows the wealthy Regina Fuller (Baranski), returning to her hometown to evict the residents and sell the land to a mall developer. Netflix released the film on November 22, 2020. At the 73rd Primetime Emmy Awards, Christmas on the Square won the award for Outstanding Television Movie.

Cast
 Dolly Parton as Angel
 Jenifer Lewis as Margeline
 Josh Segarra as Pastor Christian Hathaway
 Jeanine Mason as Felicity Sorenson
 Mary Lane Haskell as Jenna Hathaway
 Treat Williams as Carl Pellam
 Christine Baranski as Regina Fuller
 Brandon Hudson as Randy

Songs

Parton wrote all of the songs featured in the film. A soundtrack album was not released, although Parton did record versions of "Christmas Is" and "Christmas on the Square" for her 2020 album A Holly Dolly Christmas. "Try" was originally featured on Parton’s 2014 album Blue Smoke.

"Main Title" – Orchestra
"Christmas Is / Christmas on the Square / Gotta Get Out / Maybe, Just Maybe / So Sorry" – Dolly Parton, Christine Baranski, Josh Segarra, Mary Lane Haskell, Jeanine Mason, and Ensemble
"You" – Josh Segarra and Mary Lane Haskell
"Queen of Mean" – Jenifer Lewis
"Keeper of Memories" – Treat Williams
"Everybody Needs an Angel" – Dolly Parton
"Light Your Lamp" – Dolly Parton
"Wickedest Witch of the Middle" – Josh Segarra and Ensemble
"Try" – Josh Segarra, Mary Lane Haskell, and Ensemble
"Fairytale" – Selah Kimbro Jones & Christine Baranski
"Maybe, Just Maybe" (Reprise 1) – Christine Baranski
"A Father's Prayer" – Douglas Sills
"Everybody Needs an Angel" (Reprise) – Dolly Parton and Jeanine Mason
"Rearview Mirror / Happy Town / Just Dance" – Dolly Parton, Christine Baranski, and Ensemble
"Maybe, Just Maybe" (Reprise 2) – Christine Baranski
"A Father's Prayer" (Reprise) – Matthew Johnson
"Christmas Is" (Reprise) – Jeanine Mason
"Try" (Reprise) – Mary Lane Haskell
"Angels Know" – Dolly Parton
"Maybe, Just Maybe" (Reprise 3) – Christine Baranski
"Try" (Gospel Reprise) – Jenifer Lewis and Ensemble
"An Angel's Prayer" – Dolly Parton
"Forgive Me" – Christine Baranski
"Christmas Is / Christmas on the Square" (Finale) – Cast
"Try" (End Credits) – Dolly Parton

Reception
The website's critics consensus reads, "Dolly Parton's Christmas on the Square isn't quite up to its star's standards, but its overwhelming good cheer and campy self-awareness may be just what viewers are looking for." On Metacritic, it has a weighted average score of 51 out of 100 based on 7 critics, indicating "mixed or average reviews".

Accolades

See also
 List of Christmas films

References

External links
 

2020 films
2020s musical films
American musical films
American Christmas films
Christmas musicals
English-language Netflix original films
Primetime Emmy Award for Outstanding Made for Television Movie winners
2020s English-language films
2020s American films
Films directed by Debbie Allen